The 2020 Liga 3 would be the fourth season of the Liga 3 under its current name, the fifth season under its current league structure, and the only amateur league football competition in Indonesia. It was cancelled due to the COVID-19 pandemic in Indonesia.

Teams

Team changes
The following teams have changed division since the 2019 season.

Qualifying round
In contrast to last season, the teams that managed to advance to the second round in the previous season will start from their respective provincial round. First, each province held their provincial league followed by unlimited amateur teams with different competition format. Then qualified teams from provincial league will be competing in their respective region to earn 32 slots in national round.

Province round
These teams will be the representatives from their provincial league to be competing in regional round.

Notes:
 BOLD: Winner of each provincial league.
 Grey background denotes provinces that did not held province round due to COVID-19 pandemic.

See also
 2020–21 Liga 1
 2020–21 Liga 2
 2020 Piala Indonesia

References

Liga 3
Liga 3
Liga 3
Liga 3